Arena Theatre is one of the oldest theatres in Bratislava. 
It was established in 1828 on the right bank of Danube. In the beginning it served as 
an open summer amphitheatre, hence the name Arena. The current building was built in 
1898.

From its establishment till the end of the Second World War, many Hungarian, 
Austrian and German theatre companies performed there. After the war, the 
theatre was gradually closed and served as a storehouse for state-owned Slovak Television.

The theatre was revived by a group of people around mime artist Milan Sládek, opening performance 
took place in 1997. The repertoire consisted of several pantomimic performances, an annual 
pantomimic festival took place there.

In 2003, renowned Slovak actor Juraj Kukura became managing director and focus of the 
theatre shifted to drama. Performance The Goat or Who is Sylvia? was nominated 
for DOSKY Award 2004 in categories best performance and best director, Juraj 
Kukura and Emília Vášáryová won the categories for best actor/actress. A year later, 
monodrama Tiso was voted the best performance. Marián Labuda, who was performing 
Jozef Tiso, won the prize for best actor.

Notes

External links
 Official site 

Theatres in Bratislava
Culture in Bratislava
Buildings and structures in Bratislava
Theatres completed in 1898